In the Making... is the second album from Christian rock band Nevertheless, released on September 16, 2008.

Background
In the Making... was recorded in Nashville, Tennessee between the months of March and April 2008. It was produced by Rob Hawkins.

Release
The album's release date and track listing information was released in the beginning of June 2008. Within a few weeks, "Sleeping In" was released as the album's leading radio single and became a hit on Christian radio making #6 on ChristianRock.Net and as high as #24 on the December 21, 2008 R&R chart.

Track listing

References

2008 albums
Nevertheless (band) albums